(sometimes stylized in capital letters as TSUBASA) is a Japanese professional wrestler currently working as a freelancer and is best known for his tenure with the Japanese promotion Osaka Pro Wrestling where he is a former Osaka Openweight Champion. A masked wrestler, Tsubasa is  greatly influenced by lucha libre, and because of this, he has followed Mexican tradition for masked wrestlers, so his real name is not a matter of public record.

Professional wrestling career

North American independent circuit (1996–1999)
Tsubasa made an appearance at WCW Monday NITRO #97 of World Championship Wrestling on July 22, 1997, show where he fell short to Konnan.

Consejo Mundial de Lucha Libre (1996–1999)
Tsubasa made his professional wrestling debut at CMLL Martes De Coliseo, an event promoted by Consejo Mundial de Lucha Libre on June 25, 1996 where he teamed up with Atlantico and Kung Fu to defeat Damian El Guerrero, Yone Genjin and Zumbido in a 2-out-of-3 falls six man tag team match.

Tsubasa participated in the CMLL International Gran Prix branch of events. He made his first appearance at the 1997 Grand Prix where he fell short to Último Dragón in a first-round match.

Japanese independent circuit (1996–present)
As a freelancer, Tsubasa is knoen for competing in various promotions from the Japanese independence scene. At a house show promoted by 	Wrestle Association-R on September 7, 1999, he unsuccessfully challenged Masaaki Mochizuki for the WAR International Junior Heavyweight Championship. Tsubasa had a brief encounter in New Japan Pro Wrestling and at NJPW The 2nd Judgement!! on December 14, 2000, he wrestled alongside Super Delfin and Takehiro Murahama in a losing effort to Jushin Thunder Liger, Minoru Tanaka and Togi Makabe. At DDT Vol. 6 ~ Yukinori Matsui 25th Anniversary from May 16, 2019, Tsubasa teamed up with Jinsei Shinzaki and Yukio Sakaguchi to defeat Damnation (Mad Paulie, Soma Takao and Tetsuya Endo) in a six-man tag team match. At AJPW Zeus Festival 2019, an event promoted by All Japan Pro Wrestling on October 20, he teamed up with Billy Ken Kid to defeat Tajiri and Ultimate Spider Jr. At STRONGHEARTS Action 6 In Oska, an event promoted by Oriental Wrestling Entertainment on December 19, 2020, he teamed up with Gaina and HUB to defeat StrongHearts (El Lindaman, Issei Onitsuka and T-Hawk).

Dragon Gate (2013)
Tsubasa briefly stepped in the Dragon Gate promotion, making an appearance at the 2013 Gate of Destiny from November 3 where he teamed up with Ciba and We Are Team Veteran (Cima and Masaaki Mochizuki) to defeat Millennials (Flamita, Rocky Lobo, U-T and Yosuke Santa Maria) in an Eight-man tag team match. On the fourteenth night of the Summer Adventure Tag League 2013 from September 29, he fell short to Genki Horiguchi in the semi-finals of an Open the Brave Gate Championship tournament after defeating Super Shisa one night before to qualify further.

Osaka Pro Wrestling (1999–present)
Tsubasa wrestled in the very first show of the promotion, the Osaka Pro Debut Spicy Series on May 1, 1999 where he competed in a 13-man battle royal also involving Kuishinbo Kamen, Super Delfin, Virus, Violencia and others. He is a former Osaka Openweight Championship, title which he won at Osaka Pro-Wrestling Came Over! in Suminoe on February 16, 2019 by defeating Kushikatsu Oyaji.

He is known for working in the Osaka Hurricane branch of events. He made his first appearance at the Osaka Hurricane in Tokyo edition on April 2, 2004 where he unsuccessfully challenged Kaz Hayashi for the World Junior Heavyweight Championship. At the 2011 edition of the event from August 14, he teamed up with Black Buffalo, Kana and Yutaka to defeat Hayata, Hideyoshi, Masamune and Mio Shirai in an Eight-person mixed tag team match. He marked his last appearance at the 2012 edition of the event from July 22 where he teamed up with Billy Ken Kid falling short to Kaijin Habu Otoko and Shisao in a tag team match.

Championships and accomplishments
Consejo Mundial de Lucha Libre
CMLL Japan Tag Team Championship (1 time) – with El Oriental
DDT Pro Wrestling
Ironman Heavymetalweight Championship (1 time)
Dove Pro Wrestling
Dove Pro Tag Team Championship (1 time) – with Black Buffalo
Dove Pro Tag Team Title Tournament (2014-2015) – with Black Buffalo
Kyushu Pro Wrestling
Kyushu Pro Tag Team Championship (1 time) – with Billy Ken Kid
Osaka Pro Wrestling
Osaka Openweight Championship (1 time)
Osaka Tag Team Championship (5 times) – with Black Buffalo (3), Asian Cougar (1) and Billy Ken Kid (1)
Osaka Tag Festival (2003, 2004) – with Billy Ken Kid and Yutaka
Pro-Wrestling Basara
UWA World Trios Championship (1 time) – with Billy Ken Kid and Masamune
 Pro Wrestling Illustrated
 Ranked No. 206 of the top 100 male singles wrestlers in the PWI 100 in 2002

References 

1973 births
Living people
Japanese male professional wrestlers
Masked wrestlers
People from Gifu Prefecture
Unidentified wrestlers
20th-century professional wrestlers
21st-century professional wrestlers
Ironman Heavymetalweight Champions
UWA World Trios Champions